The Netherlands participated in the Eurovision Song Contest 2001 with the song "Out on My Own" written by Dirk-Jan Vermeij and André Remkes. The song was performed by Michelle. The Dutch broadcaster Nederlandse Omroep Stichting (NOS) organised the national final Nationaal Songfestival 2001 in order to select the Dutch entry for the 2001 contest in Copenhagen, Denmark. Six entries competed in the national final on 3 March 2001 where "Out on My Own" performed by Michelle was selected as the winner following the combination of votes from three jury panels and a public vote.

The Netherlands competed in the Eurovision Song Contest which took place on 12 May 2001. Performing as the opening entry for the show in position 1, the Netherlands placed eighteenth out of the 23 participating countries, scoring 16 points.

Background 

The Dutch least successful result has been last place, which they have achieved on four occasions, most recently in the 1968 contest.

The Dutch national broadcaster, Nederlandse Omroep Stichting (NOS), broadcast the event within the Netherlands and organises the selection process for the nation's entry. The Netherlands has used various methods to select the Dutch entry in the past, such as the Nationaal Songfestival, a live televised national final to choose the performer, song or both to compete at Eurovision. However, internal selections have also been held on occasion. Since 1998, NOS has organised Nationaal Songfestival in order to select both the artist and song for the contest, a method that was continued for the 2001 Dutch entry.

Before Eurovision

Nationaal Songfestival 2001 
Nationaal Songfestival 2001 was the national final developed by NOS that selected the Dutch entry for the Eurovision Song Contest 2001. Eight entries competed in the competition that consisted of a final on 3 March 2001 which took place at the Rotterdam Ahoy in Rotterdam, hosted by Paul de Leeuw and was broadcast on Nederland 2. The first part of the national final was watched by 1.8 million viewers in the Netherlands with a market share of 25%, while the second part was watched by 2.1 million viewers with a market share of 34%.

Competing entries 
A submission period was opened by the Dutch broadcaster on 20 July 2000 where artists and composers were able to submit their entries until 2 October 2000. 304 submissions were received by the broadcaster at the closing of the deadline, and the eight selected competing entries were announced on 29 December 2000. Seven of the entries for the competition came from the public submission through the decision by a selection commission consisting of Menno Timmerman, Daan van Rijsbergen, Ad Kraamer and Willem van Beusekom as well as from composers directly invited by NOS, while the remaining entry ("Danielle" performed by Montezuma's Revenge) came from Conamus which organised a workshop where a team of musicians consisting of Alan Michael, Edwin Schimscheimer, Jan Rot and Henk Westbroek worked with amateur songwriters as well as on several of the public submissions selected by the commission.

Final 
The final took place on 3 March 2001 where eight entries competed. The winner, "Out on My Own" performed by Michelle, was selected by the 50/50 combination of a public televote and the votes of three juries: a musicians jury, a composers jury and a music industry jury. The viewers and the juries each had a total of 120 points to award. Each jury group distributed their points as follows: 1, 2, 3, 5, 7, 10 and 12 points. The viewer vote was based on the percentage of votes each song achieved through the following voting methods: telephone and SMS voting. For example, if a song gained 10% of the vote, then that entry would be awarded 10% of 120 points rounded to the nearest integer: 12 points. 45,000 of the votes were cast by the public via SMS during the show.

In addition to the performances of the competing entries, the show featured guest performances by Dutch Divas, British 1976 Eurovision winner Brotherhood of Man, Swedish 1984 Eurovision winner Herreys and past Dutch Eurovision entrants Lenny Kuhr (1969), Getty Kaspers (1975), Justine Pelmelay (1989), Maxine and Franklin Brown (1996), Marlayne (1999) and Linda Wagenmakers (2000).

At Eurovision 
The Eurovision Song Contest 2001 took place at Parken Stadium in Copenhagen, Denmark, on 12 May 2001. The relegation rules introduced for the 1997 contest were again utilised ahead of the 2001 contest, based on each country's average points total in previous contests. The 23 participants were made up of the host country, the "Big Four" (France, Germany, Spain and the United Kingdom), and the 12 countries with the highest average scores between the 1996 and 2000 contests competed in the final. On 21 November 2000, a special allocation draw was held which determined the running order and the Netherlands was set to open the show and perform in position 1, before the entry from Iceland. The Netherlands finished in eighteenth place with 16 points. The 2001 contest marked the only occasion on which two performers participated under identical names: the singer from Germany was also called Michelle.

The show was broadcast in the Netherlands on Nederland 2 with commentary by Willem van Beusekom as well as via radio on Radio 2 with commentary by Hijlco Span. The Dutch spokesperson, who announced the Dutch votes during the show, was 1999 Dutch Eurovision entrant Marlayne.

Voting 
Below is a breakdown of points awarded to the Netherlands and awarded by the Netherlands in the contest. The nation awarded its 12 points to the Estonia in the contest.

References

External links 
 Dutch Preselection 2001

2001
Countries in the Eurovision Song Contest 2001
Eurovision